The Korenbeurs is a neoclassical building in Groningen in the Netherlands. It was originally used as an exchange for food grain trade. Its current tenant is Albert Heijn.

The building is a rijksmonument (national heritage site) since 1971 and is one of the Top 100 Dutch heritage sites that was selected in 1990.

References

External links 
 

Buildings and structures in Groningen (city)
History of Groningen (city)
Rijksmonuments in Groningen (province)